William Arthur Peat (1 September 1940 – 16 July 2012) was an English professional footballer who made over 400 appearances as a right half in the Football League for Southport. He is Southport's record appearance-maker with 435 and also captained and managed the club.

Career statistics

References 

English footballers
English Football League players
1940 births
Footballers from Liverpool
Association football wing halves
Southport F.C. players
Crewe Alexandra F.C. players
Southport F.C. managers
English Football League managers
2012 deaths
English football managers
Player-coaches